The men's light welterweight event was part of the boxing programme at the 1956 Summer Olympics.  The weight class was allowed boxers of up to 63.5 kilograms to compete. The competition was held from 24 November to 1 December 1956. 22 boxers from 22 nations competed.

Medalists

Results

First round
 Constantin Dumitrescu (ROU) def. Terrence Oung (BUR), PTS
 Hans Pedersen (DEN) def. Carlos Rodríguez (VEN), PTS
 Antonio Marcilla (ARG) def. Chune Pattapong (THA), RSC-1
 Leopold Potesil (AUT) def. Celestino Pinto (BRA), PTS
 Franco Nenci (ITA) def. Gul Rehmat (PAK), RSC-3
 Willi Roth (FRG) def. Thomas Schuster (FIJ), PTS

Second round
 Claude Saluden (FRA) def. Harry Perry (IRL), PTS
 Vladimir Yengibaryan (URS) def. Leszek Drogosz (POL), PTS
 Henry Loubscher (RSA) def. Leslie Mason (CAN), PTS
 Joseph Shaw (USA) def. Max Carlos (AUS), PTS
 Hwang Ui-gyeong (KOR) def. Manuel de los Santos (PHI), DSQ-2
 Constantin Dumitrescu (ROU) def. Hans Pedersen (DEN), PTS
 Antonio Marcilla (ARG) def. Leopold Potesil (AUT), PTS
 Franco Nenci (ITA) def. Willi Roth (FRG), PTS

Quarterfinals
 Vladimir Yengibaryan (URS) def. Claude Saluden (FRA), PTS
 Henry Loubscher (RSA) def. Joseph Shaw (USA), PTS
 Constantin Dumitrescu (ROU) def. Hwang Ei-Kyung (KOR), PTS
 Franco Nenci (ITA) def. Antonio Marcilla (ARG), PTS

Semifinals
 Vladimir Yengibaryan (URS) def. Henry Loubscher (RSA), PTS
 Franco Nenci (ITA) def. Constantin Dumitrescu (ROU), PTS

Final
 Vladimir Yengibaryan (URS) def. Franco Nenci (ITA), PTS

References

 https://web.archive.org/web/20080912181829/http://www.la84foundation.org/6oic/OfficialReports/1956/OR1956.pdf

Light Welterweight